Spook Creek is a stream in the U.S. state of South Dakota.

According to tradition, the "spooky" surroundings caused the name Spook Creek to be selected.

See also
List of rivers of South Dakota

References

Rivers of Meade County, South Dakota
Rivers of South Dakota